Saint-Pierre-des-Tripiers is a commune in the Lozère department in Occitanie, southern France.

See also
Communes of the Lozère department
Causse Méjean

References

Saintpierredestripiers